Daniel Keauhou Matsu Yamashiro (born December 5, 1967), also known as D. K. M. Yamashiro, is an American clergyman, author, radio and podcast host, researcher, Christian media personality, and a chaplain at MIT who survived a  fall from the ridge of the Nuʻuanu Pali in Honolulu, Hawaii, at 18. He is the first researcher to present aggregate data on childhood trauma as it relates to American presidents. Yamashiro also produced the first comprehensive study on American presidents that investigates the influence of religious development from a lens of trauma.

Survival story
On December 22, 1985, while attempting to rescue his stranded girlfriend from a  mountain-climbing fall, Danny Yamashiro slipped and fell head first  and later another . The second fall took place during a rescue effort and was captured on film. It aired on newscasts throughout Hawaii. He suffered severe head injuries, skull fractures, multiple tears in his scalp, a shattered ankle, damaged organs, extensive lacerations, and became comatose.

On May 25, 2017, Yamashiro delivered Harvard Extension School's commencement address, titled "Falling 400 Feet."

Early life
Danny Yamashiro was born in Honolulu, Hawaii to Evangeline (née Lee Kwai) and David T. Yamashiro, Sr. His father was influenced by Father Kenneth A. Bray, a noted sports hero in the islands. Yamashiro had "a lonely childhood" as the youngest of four children in Moanalua, a residential area nestled between Fort Shafter and Tripler Army Medical Center. An American of Hawaiian, Okinawan, and Chinese ancestry, he is the great-grandson of Honolulu detective Chang Apana, inspiration of the Hollywood character Charlie Chan by Earl Derr Biggers. Yamashiro graduated from Iolani School, an institution affiliated with the Episcopal Church of the United States, in 1986.

Education
Yamashiro earned a Master of Liberal Arts degree at Harvard University Extension School in Cambridge, Massachusetts, with a concentration in Government. He graduated on May 25, 2017, at Harvard's 366th commencement. An interview by Harvard described Yamashiro's journey to Cambridge from Honolulu. His thesis, Religious Influences on Crisis Presidential Decision-Making: A New Belief in the Operational Code Analysis of George W. Bush (2017), under the direction of David F. Holland from Harvard Divinity School, was featured at Harvard's annual ALM Thesis Symposium.

He attended the University of Oxford Theology Summer School at Christ Church, Oxford, England (2018, 2019), conducted research at ten presidential library archives (NARA), and earned his Doctor of Philosophy from Trinity Evangelical Divinity School of Trinity International University in Deerfield, Illinois (2020) under the guidance of Donald C. Guthrie. His dissertation is titled, American Presidents and Childhood Trauma: Intersecting Religious Education from Franklin Roosevelt to Donald Trump.

Yamashiro studied at Chaminade University (1987) in Honolulu, Hawaii, before transferring to Biola University and Talbot School of Theology in La Mirada, California, where he earned his Bachelor of Arts in Biblical Studies and Theology (1991) and Master of Arts in Bible Exposition (1993). His thesis, Jesus Christ in Every Biblical Book (1992), directed by A. Boyd Luter, explored types, symbols, prophecies and pictures of Christ in all 66 books of the Bible.

Career

Chaplain
In 2021, Danny Yamashiro became a chaplain at Massachusetts Institute of Technology (MIT). He is also co-chairperson of the Cambridge Roundtable on Science and Religion. The John Templeton Foundation sponsored program hosts meals each semester at the Harvard Faculty Club for MIT and Harvard faculty and colleagues from nearby schools and colleges to discuss topics on science, philosophy, and religion.

Researcher
Yamashiro's scholarly work on American presidents and childhood trauma utilizes an interdisciplinary approach in the social sciences that involves educational psychology, presidential history, and religious education in exploring influences on children's developmental trajectory toward leadership formation. His investigations are theoretically grounded in the writings of Lev Vygotsky. American presidents in his research sample include Franklin Roosevelt, Harry Truman, Dwight Eisenhower, John Kennedy, Richard Nixon, Jimmy Carter, Ronald Reagan, George H. W. Bush, Bill Clinton, George W. Bush, Barack Obama, and Donald Trump. Yamashiro's earlier research in religious influences on presidential decision-making was built on the work of Herbert A. Simon, Albert Bandura, and Nathan Leites.

Radio and podcast host
In 2022, Yamashiro began hosting the talk show The Good Life with Dr. Danny weekdays on WEZE and WROL, two Christian stations in Boston that are owned by Salem Communications reaching New England. His podcasts are heard on major podcast platforms. Yamashiro also hosts A Slice of The Good Life which airs daily throughout the United States, internationally in Ontario, Canada; Kent, England; and Malaybalay City, Philippines and formerly aired in Greater Los Angeles on Salem Communications 99.5 KKLA-FM. Since 2008 Yamashiro has hosted Hawaii's only locally based daily Christian radio talk show, The Good Life Hawaii, on Salem Communications 99.5 KGU-FM,

Evangelist and pastor
In 1993, he founded Jesus Christ Is Calling You Evangelistic Ministry, Inc. (JCCY) and launched a series of large-scale revival tent meetings throughout Hawaii. Since 1998, his organization formed Paradise Global Mission and expanded to reach several countries worldwide with medical and dental clinics, sports clinics and numerous forms of humanitarian aid by supporting the work of Christian churches in rural locations.

He was the founding pastor of Christ's Church at Kapolei, affiliated with the Evangelical Free Church of America, and served as senior pastor for nine years (1998–2007).

Awards and associations
Yamashiro won the Harvard Extension School Commencement Speaker Prize (2017). He was awarded Biola University's Young Alumni Award (2000) and has received numerous certificates of recognition from the Hawaii Senate, Hawaii House of Representatives, Honolulu City Council and the Mayor of Honolulu, Jeremy Harris. Yamashiro was selected for the Pacific Century Fellows and offered a prayer at a celebratory dinner hosted by the Governor of Hawaii, Benjamin Cayetano at the historic "Washington Place" (1999).

Danny Yamashiro is ordained by the Evangelical Free Church of America.

Family
Yamashiro is married to Jamie (née Tokuda) Yamashiro. They have three children: Allie, Hugh and Luke.

Works

Books
Yamashiro has authored the following books:

Theses

References

External links

 Official website

1967 births
20th-century evangelicals
21st-century American clergy
21st-century evangelicals
American autobiographers
American Christian clergy
American Christian religious leaders
American Christian theologians
American Christian writers
American Christians
American evangelicals
American evangelists
American humanitarians
American motivational speakers
American people of Chinese descent
American people of Native Hawaiian descent
American podcasters
American self-help writers
American talk radio hosts
American television talk show hosts
American theologians
American writers of Chinese descent
Biola University alumni
Chaminade University of Honolulu alumni
Christian revivalists
Fall survivors
Harvard Extension School alumni
Hawaii people of Okinawan descent
ʻIolani School alumni
Living people
Members of the Evangelical Free Church of America
Native Hawaiian writers
People from Brookline, Massachusetts
Talbot School of Theology alumni
Trinity Evangelical Divinity School alumni
Trinity International University alumni
Writers from Brookline, Massachusetts
Writers from Honolulu